Pseudozoysia is a monotypic genus of plant in the grass family. The only known species is Pseudozoysia sessilis, found only in Somalia.

References

Chloridoideae
Monotypic Poaceae genera
Endemic flora of Somalia